PIA Planetarium is a planetarium in Lahore, Pakistan run by Pakistan International Airlines. It was established after the establishment of PIA Planetarium, Karachi. It contains a dome building and a retired Boeing 720-047B (registration AP-AXL)  standing in a park.

References 

Planetaria in Pakistan
Pakistan International Airlines
Buildings and structures in Lahore